John Archibald Boyd-Carpenter, Baron Boyd-Carpenter, PC, DL (2 June 1908 – 11 July 1998) was a British Conservative politician.

Early life
He was the only son of Conservative politician Sir Archibald Boyd-Carpenter MP and his wife Annie Dugdale. He was educated at Stowe School, Buckinghamshire, and at Balliol College, Oxford, where he was President of the Oxford Union in 1930. He graduated with a BA in History, and a Diploma in Economics in 1931. He was Harmsworth Law Scholar at the Middle Temple in 1933 and called to Bar the next year, and practised in the London and South-East Circuit.

War service
Boyd-Carpenter joined the Scots Guards in 1940 and held various staff appointments, including with the Allied Military Government in Italy, retiring with the rank of Major.

Political career
Boyd-Carpenter contested the Limehouse district for the London County Council in 1934. He was elected as Conservative Member of Parliament for Kingston-upon-Thames in 1945, holding the seat until 1972, when he was raised to the peerage.

He held ministerial office as Financial Secretary to the Treasury from 1951 to 1954. In 1954 he was promoted to Minister of Transport and Civil Aviation and appointed a Privy Counsellor. In December 1955 he was moved to the position of Minister of Pensions and National Insurance, which he held until July 1962 (the young Margaret Thatcher served under him as Parliamentary Secretary, her first ministerial job, from October 1961). He was then Chief Secretary to the Treasury and Paymaster-General from 1962 to 1964.

When Alec Douglas-Home became Prime Minister in October 1963, he initially promised Boyd-Carpenter the job of Leader of the House of Commons, but in the end the job went to Selwyn Lloyd who was returning to government from the backbenches.

Following the Conservative defeat in 1964, he served as Opposition Front Bench Spokesman on Housing, Local Government and Land, 1964–66, and as Chairman of the Public Accounts Committee from 1964 to 1970. He later held a number of Party and business appointments.

He was appointed a life peer on 1 May 1972, as Baron Boyd-Carpenter, of Crux Easton in the County of Southampton. His successor at the ensuing byelection was Norman Lamont, the future Chancellor of the Exchequer under John Major.

As the first Chairman of the UK's Civil Aviation Authority (CAA), Boyd-Carpenter was in charge at the time of the collapse of the UK airline Court Line and their subsidiary Clarksons Travel Group in August 1974.

Family
In 1937, Boyd-Carpenter married Margaret ("Peggy") Mary, daughter of Lieutenant-Colonel George Leslie Hall, OBE, of the Royal Engineers. Boyd-Carpenter's son, Thomas Boyd-Carpenter, was himself knighted following his military and public service careers. One of his two daughters, Sarah Hogg, Baroness Hogg, married Douglas Hogg, 3rd Viscount Hailsham, and is a life peer in her own right.

Arms

References

Mosley, Charles, editor. Burke's Peerage, Baronetage & Knightage, 107th edition, 3 volumes. Wilmington, Delaware, U.S.A.: Burke's Peerage (Genealogical Books) Ltd, 2003.
 Who Was Who  http://www.ukwhoswho.com/view/article/oupww/whowaswho/U177068
 Google Books entry A Guide to the Papers of British Cabinet Ministers 1900–1964 By Cameron Hazlehurst, Sally Whitehead, Christine Woodland

External links
 
 

1908 births
1998 deaths
Alumni of Balliol College, Oxford
Scots Guards officers
British Army personnel of World War II
Conservative Party (UK) life peers
Deputy Lieutenants of Greater London
Members of the Privy Council of the United Kingdom
Conservative Party (UK) MPs for English constituencies
Presidents of the Oxford Union
Presidents of the Oxford University Conservative Association
People educated at Stowe School
UK MPs 1945–1950
UK MPs 1950–1951
UK MPs 1951–1955
UK MPs 1955–1959
UK MPs 1959–1964
UK MPs 1964–1966
UK MPs 1966–1970
UK MPs 1970–1974
UK MPs who were granted peerages
United Kingdom Paymasters General
John
Secretaries of State for Transport (UK)
Ministers in the third Churchill government, 1951–1955
Ministers in the Eden government, 1955–1957
Ministers in the Macmillan and Douglas-Home governments, 1957–1964
Life peers created by Elizabeth II
Chief Secretaries to the Treasury